Otabek Bahriddinovich Murodov (Uzbek: Отабек Бахритдинович Муродов; born, April 6, 1975) is an Uzbek statesman and politician who was the Prosecutor General of Uzbekistan from 2018 to 2019 and State Adviser.

Biography 
Otabek Murodov was born on April 6, 1975 in the Yakkabog, Yakkabog District, Uzbek SSR. In 1992 he graduated from A.S.Pushkin Secondary School No. 3 in Shakhrisabz, and was awarded a gold medal for excellent achievements and exemplary behavior in high school. In 1989-1991 he headed the youth organization of the school. In 1992, he entered the Faculty of International Legal Relations of the Tashkent Law Institute (now the university), from which he graduated with honors and a PhD in Law in 1997. He started his career in 1997 as an intern of the prosecutor's office of Shahrisabz District. In April-June 1998 he acted as investigator of the Prosecutor's office of the Chirakchi district. In the period from October 1998 to July 1999, he was an investigator of the Prosecutor's office in the Yukorichirchik and Kibray districts of the Tashkent region. 

From 1999 to 2002, he was an investigator for particularly important cases of the Crime Investigation Department of the Tashkent Region Prosecutor's Office. From 2002 to 2005, he was a senior investigator for particularly important cases of the Crime Investigation Department of the Prosecutor General's Office of the Republic of Uzbekistan. In the period from January to August 2005 he was Prosecutor of the Chirakchi district. From August to October 2005 he was the head of the Information and Analytical Department and Deputy Head of the Investigation Supervision Department in the Prosecutor's Office of the General Prosecutor's Office of the Republic of Uzbekistan. 

In October 2005, Murodov was transferred to work in the Office of the President of Uzbekistan. From 2005-2009, he was a leading inspector on countering terrorism and religious extremism in the Office of the President of the Republic of Uzbekistan. In 2009 he began working as Chief Inspector for Pardon and Citizenship, Chief Inspector for Justice, Prosecutor's Office and courts of the Office of the President of the Republic of Uzbekistan until 2011. From 2011-2014 he worked as Deputy Minister of Justice as the Head of the Main Department for Monitoring the Implementation of Legislation of the Ministry of Justice of the Republic of Uzbekistan, before becoming Chairman of the Higher Qualification Commission for the Selection and Nomination of Judges under the President of the Republic of Uzbekistan in 2014. 

He remained in this position until 2015, when he became the State Adviser to the President of the Republic of Uzbekistan on interaction with the Oliy Majlis, public and political organizations until 2017. From 2017 to 2018 he acted as the State Adviser of the President of the Republic of Uzbekistan on political and legal issues until becoming the Prosecutor General of the Republic of Uzbekistan in 2018, where he was in office until 2019.

Awards 
By the Decree of the President of the Republic of Uzbekistan dated August 28, 2002, he was awarded the "Jasorat Medal".

Arrest 
On June 20, 2019, he was dismissed from the position of the prosecutor general and was involved in the investigation in the framework of the case of the former prosecutor general, Ikhtiyor Abdullayev. He was imprisoned on September 18.
On February 25, 2020, by the decree of the military court of the Republic of Uzbekistan, the sentence of imprisonment for a period of 5 years was appointed.

References 

1975 births
Living people
People from Qashqadaryo Region
Prosecutors general
21st-century Uzbekistani politicians
Government advisors